Ashley James is an American curator. She has worked at the Studio Museum in Harlem, the Museum of Modern Art and the Brooklyn Museum. In 2019, she became the first full-time black curator at the Guggenheim.

Biography 
James earned her bachelors degree at Columbia University in 2009. After Columbia, she worked as an intern at the Studio Museum in Harlem. James did her masters at Yale where she studied English literature and African American studies. While at Yale, she was a co-curator in 2014 at the Yale University Art Gallery. James was a Mellon Curatorial Fellow at the Museum of Modern Art.

The Brooklyn Museum hired James as an assistant curator of contemporary art in 2017. While at the Brooklyn Museum, she was a "moving force behind the acclaimed exhibition 'Soul of a Nation: Art in the Age of Black Power.'" As lead curator of the show, it was the largest she had ever worked on before. James was also played a major role in doing acquisitions and public programming for the museum.

James started as an associate curator of contemporary art at the Guggenheim in November 2019. She is the first black curator to work for the museum full-time.

References

External links 
Brooklyn Museum's "Soul of a Nation: Art in the Age of Black Power" (video)

Living people
Year of birth missing (living people)
Columbia College (New York) alumni
Yale University alumni
African-American curators
American art curators
American women curators
21st-century African-American people
21st-century African-American women